The Maicoletta was a motor scooter built by Maico from 1955  to 1966. It was noted by motorcycle journalists in the United States and the United Kingdom for being powerful, responsive, and comfortable. It was one of the heaviest and most expensive motor scooters with typical styling and engineering of its time, and comparable to other manufacturers' products such as Heinkel Tourist, Zündapp Bella and the British Triumph Tigress and BSA Sunbeam.

The Maicoletta was highly regarded in the United Kingdom. When Maico stopped making the Maicoletta, the U.K. importer built more of them from its spare parts inventory.

The two-stroke engine of the Maicoletta used an unusual starter that rocked the crankshaft back and forth before firing instead of rotating it.

History
The Maicoletta was introduced in 1955. It used components based on those used in Maico's conventional motorcycles, including the engine, transmission, and front forks. It was built to compete in the German scooter market of the 1950s.  Maico had earlier introduced an enclosed motorcycle with superior weather protection for the rider, the Maico Mobil, that was marketed as a "two-wheeled car" with interchangeable wheels and a spare wheel mounted  into the barrel shaped bodywork behind the number plate and rear lamp. The Maicoletta used the fourteen-inch wheels, gear ratio indicator, and headlights from the Mobil.

When the Maicoletta was first exported to the United Kingdom, it was one of the heaviest and most expensive scooters sold there. Though known as the “dustbin” amongst British scooterists with Italianate tastes, it gained a reputation in the U.K. as a high-quality, heavy, powerful, scooter capable of being ridden in comfort over long distances.   The brakes were noted at the time by Motor Cycling and Scooter Weekly for being powerful and progressive in that the braking force increased with increased effort against the braking controls. The optional 277 cc engine was considered particularly useful with a sidecar combination, as was the steering damper.

Maico stopped offering the 174 cc and 277 cc engine options in 1962 and ended production of the Maicoletta in 1966. Demand for Maicolettas in the U.K. was such that the importer used its inventory of spare parts to build new Maicolettas to special order until late 1967.

Specifications

Frame and suspension
The Maicoletta had a tubular steel frame with pressed steel body panels. Front suspension was with a telescopic fork with coil springs, hydraulic damping, and a steering damper. Rear suspension was with a swingarm with dual coil springs and twin hydraulic dampers. The wheels were 14 inches in diameter and had a width between 3.25 inches and 3.5 inches. Drum brakes were used front and rear.

Drivetrain
The Maicoletta had a fan-cooled single-cylinder piston port two-stroke engine, originally of either 174 cc or 247 cc. A 277 cc engine became available in 1957.  The transmission had four ratios and was controlled by a heel-and-toe pedal. The engine and transmission were mounted on the frame and drove the rear wheel through an enclosed drive chain.

Pendulum starter
The Maicoletta used a Bosch six volt 'pendulum' electric starter system. When activated, instead of rotating the crankshaft, the starter used the generator coils on the shaft to rock it back and forth under the control of cams on the crankshaft. These cams closed contacts in the starter to trigger a reversing switch in the control box that changed the crankshaft direction at the end of each swing. This gives the impression of the crankshaft continually bouncing back and forwards against compression, when operated. A separate set of ignition points fired the spark plug in the forward direction only, and when this fires the mixture in the cylinder the engine starts to rotate normally, the starter is released and the normal ignition system takes over. This system was possible due to the piston port induction system of the two-stroke engine.

The advantage of this system is that the starter does not have to force the crankshaft to turn over against compression, so less power is required from the 6 volt system. Its disadvantage is the unusually large number of contacts, which can be difficult to adjust. The reversing switch contacts tend to wear out with extended use and can be very difficult to service or to have serviced, hence the scooter's reputation for requiring roll starts later in life. The Maicoletta did not have a kick starter.

Ergonomics
The Maicoletta was noted for being large and comfortable, with an exceptionally large and commodious dual seat and room for the rider and passenger to move around and avoid fatigue.

The Maicoletta had a dashboard with a speedometer and an eight-day clock.  A gear ratio indicator was incorporated in the speedometer.

The drivetrain was covered by the rear bodywork, which could be removed as a unit by loosening one bolt and unplugging the lead to the taillight. Access to the fuel cap and the spark plug was also available by unlocking and lifting the hinged seat, and an access panel on the left side allowed access to the carburettor.

One ergonomic concern was the considerable effort required to mount the Maicoletta on its centre stand.  This made it difficult for small riders or riders of slight build to park the scooter. Another concern was the cold-start lever, which was positioned below the glove box and was not readily visible.

See also
List of motorcycles of the 1950s

References

Citations

Sources

Further reading

External links

 

Maico motorcycles
Motor scooters
Motorcycles introduced in 1955